In enzymology, a 3-oxoacid CoA-transferase is an enzyme that catalyzes the chemical reaction

succinyl-CoA + a 3-oxo acid  succinate + a 3-oxoacyl-CoA

Thus, the two substrates of this enzyme are succinyl-CoA and 3-oxo acid, whereas its two products are succinate and 3-oxoacyl-CoA.

This enzyme belongs to the family of transferases, specifically the CoA-transferases.  The systematic name of this enzyme class is succinyl-CoA:3-oxo-acid CoA-transferase. Other names in common use include 3-oxoacid coenzyme A-transferase, 3-ketoacid CoA-transferase, 3-ketoacid coenzyme A transferase, 3-oxo-CoA transferase, 3-oxoacid CoA dehydrogenase, acetoacetate succinyl-CoA transferase, acetoacetyl coenzyme A-succinic thiophorase, succinyl coenzyme A-acetoacetyl coenzyme A-transferase, and succinyl-CoA transferase.  This enzyme participates in 3 metabolic pathways: synthesis and degradation of ketone bodies, valine, leucine and isoleucine degradation, and butanoate metabolism.

This protein may use the morpheein model of allosteric regulation.

Structural studies

References

 
 
 
 

EC 2.8.3
Enzymes of known structure